The University of the Third Age (U3A) is an international movement whose aims are the education and stimulation of mainly retired members of the community—those in their third 'age' of life.

There is no universally accepted model for the U3A. Its original conception in France as an extramural university activity was significantly modified in the United Kingdom where it was recognized that most people of retirement age have something to contribute and the emphasis has been on sharing, without formal educational links.

Many English-speaking countries have followed this geragogic model, whereas continental European countries have mostly followed the French model.  For historical reasons, lifelong learning institute is the term used in the United States for organizations that are similar to U3A groups.

A British U3A website reports this about "The Third Age" membership eligibility: "The 'third age' is defined by a time in your life (not necessarily chronological) where you have the opportunity to undertake learning for its own sake. There is no minimum age, but a focus on people who are no longer in full-time employment or raising a family."

History

France 
U3A started in France at the Faculty of Social Sciences in Toulouse in 1973. It was started by Prof. Pierre Vellas. In France, each University of the Third Age University group is mostly associated with a local university. This academic model is used in many other countries, in particular in continental Europe. The university affiliation generates various opportunities such as highly qualified teaching personnel, a variety of subject choices, opportunity for students and faculty to conduct research based on the professional, cultural or historical experiences of the elderly, etc. U3As do not issue diplomas but rather certificates and teach in many fields according to the interests of the groups of older students (usually 55+) such as computer skills, languages, entrepreneurship, hereditary law, religion, politics, etc. Sometimes U3As provide groups with vocational training and formal continuous education opportunities.

In the 1990s the concept was broadened in France to the notion of the University of All Ages (UTA - université tous âges) or University of Free Time (UTL - université du temps libre). The UFUTA changed its name to Union Française des Universités de Tous Ages (retaining the acronym). Some French university departments have adopted the title of Université du Temps Libre.

AIUTA (Association Internationale des Universités du Troisième Âge) is the global international organization and network of Universities of the Third Age, including such institutions from most continental European countries, Central and East Europe, China, Russia, Latin America, etc., including Mauritius and other destinations. The president of AIUTA is prof. François Vellas from the University of Toulouse, son of Pierre Vellas, the founder of the first U3A.

United Kingdom 

By the early 1980s, the concept reached the United Kingdom, where its nature was radically changed to be more a self-help organization under the influence of its founders, Peter Laslett, Michael Young and Eric Midwinter.

The UK network comprises in excess of 1,000 groups, in towns and cities; as of January 2020 total membership exceeded 450,000.

Each U3A is formally structured as an independent self-financing and self-managing charity with links to the Third Age Trust, a national coordinating body. Each individual U3A comprises a number of activity groups which may cover a wide range of different topics - e.g. arts, languages, physical activity, discussion, and games. Most U3A's are centred on a particular town or region and their activity groups meet in a hired hall or small groups meet in a member's house. There is some provision for members to take part in activities over the internet. There is general agreement that not only physical but intellectual activity enrich and prolong life in the later years. Although primarily for the retired, many U3As open their membership to any people not in full-time employment, thus becoming more inclusive and widening the age range of the membership.

In 2009 the Virtual University of the Third Age (vU3A) was launched with the intention of offering the same friendship, support and learning enjoyed by off-line groups. vU3A is affiliated to the Third Age Trust in the UK. vU3A is open to anyone, in particular those who, by circumstances of isolation, health problems or other restrictions, cannot get to a U3A group.

Some groups in other countries affiliate to the Third Age Trust. For example, in Cyprus there are C3A (Cyprus Third Age) and P3A (Paphos Third Age).

Central, Southern and Eastern Europe 
Some Central (and Eastern) European countries were introduced to the U3A quite early: Poland, Czech Republic (formerly part of Czechoslovakia) and Slovenia. The Slovenian University of the Third Age was started by two university professors in 1984 and has developed into a network of 40 universities over the entire country. The Italian University of the Third Age is called Università delle Tre Età (UNITRE) with several locations in the country. "UNITRE Milano", the university of the third age in Milan, provides courses as well as educational content such as on line courses and peer reviewed journal articles.

There is an online University of the Third Age in Russia at http://u3a.niuitmo.ru/.

Australia 
U3A began in Australia in 1984 and as of 2023, has grown to 250 U3As with approximately 100,000 members. These are based in metropolitan, regional and rural areas, and follow the British self-help model of teaching and learning over a wide range of subject areas, dependent upon the membership's own expertise, knowledge and skills.

Each U3A operates independently and takes the needs and interests of their members into consideration when deciding which classes/activities they will offer. U3As take great pride in offering membership at very low cost so that anyone in their third age (nearing retirement and beyond) can become a member.
Each U3A is also a member of a state/territory Network (where available). These networks are a great support to each U3A providing the opportunity to share ideas/tutors and resources.

U3AA (U3A Australia) is the national body formed by state networks to support all U3As in their state or territory with a range of resources. 

The benefits of keeping mentally, physically and socially active have been well researched and are generally accepted to ward off the worst evils of ageing and help people stay living independently in their own homes for longer.

Canada 
The Third Age Network (TAN) is very active in Canada, however currently only within the province of Ontario.  The head office is located at the G. Raymond Chang School of Continuing Education at Toronto Metropolitan University in Toronto> The network started in 2007 and has grown to 21 groups by 2018. Simon Fraser University was the first university in North America to create a series of specially designed courses for seniors at the post-secondary level. Its mandate was to provide educational programs for older adults that were responsive to their unique psychological and physiological characteristics.

The Third Age Mission: "To foster Third Age Learning and share issues and solutions to common organizational challenges. We do this by promoting the establishment of organizations that provide opportunities for older adults to learn in a friendly, social setting and by supporting adult learning organizations in this process by sharing strategies and techniques to accomplish this goal."

TAN runs a newsletter and hosts organization-wide symposiums and forums.  It also provides support to local groups with things like information on speakers, networking with colleagues, data on member operations, including honoraria paid to speakers, board make up, rental costs, affordable group insurance, a regular newsletter, conferences and workshop, guidance for creating a website, internal and external communication.

To read more about U3A in Canada, see this page on the UBC website.

United States 
In the United States, organizations similar to U3A are called lifelong learning institutes.

Courses 

Typical courses include Art, Classical Studies, Conversation, Computers, Crafts, Debate, Drama, Film/Cinema Studies, History, Languages, Literature, Music, Sciences, Social Sciences, and Philosophy.

There are also many less educationally focused activities, such as Games (including bridge tuition and duplicate bridge playing groups), Health, Fitness & Leisure (including countryside walks), Theatre/Concert Clubs, Travel Clubs, and Dance in all its forms.

Some study groups work to a formal syllabus, but others draw on current affairs or specific interests of group members. Some groups are designed to cross disciplinary boundaries, for example, combining Society, Technology and Science in a fashion not practical in more formal academic environments.

U3A groups are well positioned to conduct serious research into local history and genealogy. For example, a group in Eyemouth collected and exhibited many photographs of life and work in the district over the years. Some groups aim to bridge the generation gap in the field of information technology, opening up an exciting new world to many who might have been oblivious of it otherwise. Internet marketing is especially important for members in more remote locations.

Newsletter 
Many U3As publish local newsletters as do some of their special interest networks. In the UK the Third Age Trust, the coordinating body in the UK, publishes a national magazine. Third Age Matters publishes five times per year plus an educational bulletin called Sources, for subscribing U3A members three times annually.

The U3A can also provide a valuable resource in considering many local and national issues. Membership includes many with experience and expertise in almost all walks of life and letters. Although strictly non-political, U3A members have time to reflect in a mature fashion on such topics as the operation of public services, crime and punishment, the future of energy supplies, public funding of the arts and so on, and can reply to invitations to engage in public consultations with carefully considered and argued responses.

References

Bibliography
Midwinter, E. (2004) "500 Beacons: The U3A Story", Third Age Press UK. KINDLE edition (2014).

Formosa, M. (2000). "Older adult education in a Maltese University of the Third Age: A critical perspective". Education and Ageing, 15(3): 315–339.
Formosa, M. (2005). "Feminism and critical educational gerontology: An agenda for good practice". Ageing International, 30(4): 396–411.
Formosa, M. (2007). "A Bourdieusian interpretation of the University of the Third Age in Malta". Journal of Maltese Education Research, 4(2): 1–16.
Formosa, M. (2009). "Renewing Universities of the Third Age: Challenges and visions for the future". Recerca, 9: 171–196.
Formosa, M. (2010). "Lifelong learning in later life: The Universities of the Third Age". Lifelong Learning Institute Review, 5: 1–12.
Kerka, S. (1999). Universities of the Third Age: Learning in Retirement. Trends and Issues Alert No. 2. www.calpro-online.org

Swindell, R. & Thompson, J. (1995). "An international perspective of the University of the Third Age". Educational Gerontology, 21(5): 429–447.
Swindell, R. (2002). "U3A Online: a virtual university of the third age for isolated older people". International Journal of Lifelong Education 21(5): 414–429.
Szeloch, H. (2011). "Na naukę nigdy nie jest za późno". "Nowe Życie", (445)9: 11–12.

External links 

U3A in the Republic of Ireland: *https://www.ageaction.ie/how-we-can-help/lifelong-learning-u3a
 U3A in the UK
U3A Cambridge
U3A Dulwich & District 
 U3A London South East
U3A Poole
 U3A Richmond-upon-Thames
U3A Bicester
 U3A in Australia:
 Youtube video of the U3A Carnival of Learning 2011 at Federation Square, Melbourne.
 in Bendigo Victoria
 in Brisbane Queensland
 in the Hawkesbury Area, NSW
 in Hawthorn/Glen Iris Victoria
 in Melbourne
 in Redcliffe Queensland
in Port Macquarie, NSW
in Perth, Western Australia
 U3A in Belarus:
U3A in Minsk
 U3A in Grodno 
 U3A and variations in Cyprus:
 U3A Cyprus (Larnaca)
 C3A (Cyprus Third Age)
 P3A (Paphos Third Age
 U3A in the Dominican Republic
U3A in Iceland
 U3A in South Africa
 U3A in Scotland
 U3A in Swansea
 U3A in New Zealand
 International Network for Universities of the Third Age
 U3A in Russia: U3A in Russia
 U3A in Spain:
 U3A in Marbella
 U3A in Moraira-Teulada, Costa Blanca
 U3A in Javea, Costa Blanca
 U3A Calpe, Costa Blanca
 U3A Torrevieja, Costa Blanca
 U3A Vall del Pop
 U3A Costa del Sol
 U3A Costa Brava
 U3A Oliva
 U3A Marina Baixa
 U3A El Morche

Educational institutions established in 1973
Seniors' organizations
Educational stages
Adult education
Lifelong learning
Higher education